Dark Road may refer to:
 Dark Road (novel), a 1946 mystery novel by Doris Miles Disney
 Dark Road (play), a 2013 play by Ian Rankin
 "Dark Road", a 2007 song by Annie Lennox
 "Dark Road", a 2013 song from the album Build Me Up from Bones by Sarah Jarosz
"Dark Road" (2012),  Longmire, season 1, episode 2